Wallington is a country house and gardens located about  west of Morpeth, Northumberland, England, near the village of Cambo. It has been owned by the National Trust since 1942, after it was donated complete with the estate and farms by Sir Charles Philips Trevelyan, the first donation of its kind. It is a Grade I listed building. Much of the wealth of the Trevelyan family derived from the holding of slaves in Grenada.

History
The estate was owned by the Fenwick family from 1475 until Sir John Fenwick, 3rd Baronet had financial problems and opted to sell his properties to the Blacketts in 1688. He sold the rump of the family estates and Wallington Hall to Sir William Blackett for £4000 and an annuity of £2000 a year. The annuity was to be paid for his lifetime and that of his wife, Mary Fenwick. Blackett was happy with the deal as he discovered lead on the land and he became rich.

The hall house was rebuilt, demolishing the ancient pele tower, although the cellars of the early medieval house remain. The house was substantially rebuilt again, in Palladian style, for Sir Walter Blackett by architect Daniel Garret, before passing to the Trevelyan family in 1777.

After Pauline Jermyn married the naturalist Sir Walter Calverley Trevelyan, they began hosting literary and scientific figures at the Hall. As a cultural centre, Wallington visitors included the members of the Pre-Raphaelite Brotherhood.

Sir Charles Philips Trevelyan inherited the property from his father, Sir George Otto Trevelyan, in 1928. He was a leading member of Liberal and Labour governments. Charles was married to "Molly", Lady Mary Trevelyan.

Description

Set in 100 acres (40 ha) of rolling parkland, the estate includes a wooded dene (valley), ornamental lakes, lawns, and a recently refurbished walled garden.

Alongside the beautifully furnished interior, attractions inside the house include the desk where Thomas Babington Macaulay, brother-in-law of Sir Charles Trevelyan, wrote his History of England, a large collection of antique dollshouses, and eight murals in the central hall depicting the history of Northumberland, painted by William Bell Scott.

The National Trust also own the estate of which the house is a part; the produce from these farms, as well as others in the region, was sold in a farm shop on site. The farm shop closed in 2012.

See also
 West Grange Hall

References

External links 

 Wallington information at The National Trust
 Wallington Hall Garden - design and history
 The Blacketts of North East England

Further reading
 
 Moran, Mollie.  Minding the Manor: the Memoir of a 1930s English Kitchen Maid.  2014, Lyons Press.  First published in the UK in 2013 as Aprons and Silver Spoons by Penguin Books.

Gardens in Northumberland
Country houses in Northumberland
National Trust properties in Northumberland
Grade I listed buildings in Northumberland
Historic house museums in Northumberland
Gardens by Capability Brown